Ernest William Sigley (2 September 1938 – 15 August 2021) was an Australian television host, comedian, variety performer, radio presenter and singer. Known as a pioneer of radio and television in Australian, he was often styled as a "little Aussie battler" with a larrikin sense of humour.

Sigley started his career in radio, before becoming a presenter of TV programs and was best known for his self-titled program The Ernie Sigley Show and Saturday Night Live as well as original host of game show Wheel of Fortune, after presenting talk shows with his frequent co-presenter Denise Drysdale in the late 80s and early 90s, he returned to presenting radio broadcasts, until retiring in 2009.

Biography

Early life and career 
Sigley was born in Footscray, Melbourne, one of seven children of a boilermaker. After completing his education at Williamstown High School, his career began in 1952 as a turntable operator on Danny Webb's breakfast program at radio station 3DB.

Television started in Australia in 1956 and Sigley made his TV debut in 1957 as host of Teenage Mailbag, later known as The Teenage Show, on Seven Network's HSV-7. Shortly after this, he travelled to London, gaining some work experience at the BBC. But a bigger break was to come with a three-year stint at Radio Luxembourg, where he performed under the name "Ernie Williams".

Sigley is remembered for his 1964 association with the Adelaide leg of the Beatles' tour of Australia. In one press conference, his questioning of the Beatles brought about an enthusiastic response from John Lennon, which led to one of the more notable interviews of the tour.

Radio 
In 1981, Sigley returned to 3DB to host the breakfast program. In 1982, he switched to the breakfast shift at the personality-driven News Talk 3UZ.
In 1996, Sigley joined 3AW to host the afternoon program. He hosted the afternoon program for 12 years until his retirement on 7 November 2008. Denis Walter was announced as Sigley's replacement. He then took on a part-time role at the station where he partnered either Bruce Mansfield or Philip Brady to host Nightline on Friday nights.

Television 
Sigley was part of the original cast of variety TV program Sunnyside Up, In the 1960s and early 1970s, he hosted the prime time Adelaide variety show Adelaide Tonight on NWS-9.

Beginning in 1974, he was the host of the national Nine Network variety show The Ernie Sigley Show, featuring notable Australian media personalities such as Denise Drysdale, Noni Hazlehurst, Pete Smith and Joy Westmore. The program was abruptly axed after an off-air outburst by Sigley, directed at station owner Kerry Packer and producer Peter Faiman, when the network cut short his first show for 1976 to accommodate a network sports awards telecast. Packer flew to Melbourne the next day and dismissed Sigley in person, effective immediately, and replaced him with Don Lane.

After his dismissal in 1976, Sigley moved to ATV-0 and hosted the early evening variety show Ernie and then, in 1978, The Penthouse which became Saturday Night Live on HSV-7 co-hosting with Mary Hardy.

Sigley was the original host of the Australian version of the popular game show Wheel of Fortune from 1981 to 1984. In 1982, he presented the regional variety program Six Tonight from BTV-6 in Ballarat and the daytime talent show Pot Luck in 1987.

After a break from television, Sigley returned in 1989 with Denise Drysdale, hosting GTV-9's morning program In Melbourne Today.

Sigley was involved in an argument with fellow TV star Don Lane at a Logies after party in 1988, when Sigley allegedly made insulting remarks about Lane's partner.

Singing 
Sigley began singing as a choir boy at St Paul's Cathedral, Melbourne, and went on to be a regular on the local town hall circuit in the 1950s. In 1957 his first record, "Love Is A Golden Ring", was released.

In 1974, Sigley, with Denise Drysdale, recorded the popular duet "Hey Paula", a cover of a hit by US duo Paul & Paula released by Festival Records and produced at Armstrong Studios, Melbourne. The record was produced and arranged by Brian Rangott and engineered by Ian McKenzie and peaked at number 2 in Australia.

Sigley regularly performed around Australia on the club circuit, often with his television partner Denise Drysdale.

Awards 
Sigley won the TV Week Gold Logie Award for Most Popular Personality on Australian Television in 1975. He had previously won eleven local Logies for his work in Adelaide.

Personal life 
Three times married and twice divorced, Sigley was married to Glenys O'Brien, former television personality, for 47 years. They lived in Atkins Ave, Glen Iris in the eastern suburbs of Melbourne and had four children. His son Matthew was a keyboardist for the Australian bands the Earthmen, the Fauves and Drop City.

Sigley was a supporter of the Western Bulldogs (formerly known as the Footscray Football Club) in the Australian Football League. He was also a supporter of the South Adelaide Football Club in the South Australian National Football League.

Sigley once owned the Radio Springs Hotel at Lyonville in country Victoria.

Sigley's family announced in October 2016 that he had Alzheimer's disease. He died on 15 August 2021, aged 82.

Filmography

Selected TV

Actor

Studio albums

Charting singles

References

External links 
 
 

1938 births
2021 deaths
Australian game show hosts
Gold Logie winners
3AW presenters
Comedians from Melbourne
Television personalities from Melbourne
Neurological disease deaths in Australia
Deaths from Alzheimer's disease
Radio personalities from Melbourne
People from Footscray, Victoria